Sam's Town Gambling Hall, Kansas City was a riverboat casino in Kansas City, Missouri, docked at I-435 and MO-210.  It was owned and operated by Boyd Gaming.

History
In September 1995, Sam's Town Gambling Hall, Kansas City opened as the fourth casino under the brand, and the fifth casino in the Kansas City area.

In February 1996, Sam's Town dropped the admission fee that had run as high as $9 per person.  This fee was used in the past to pay for the $2 per person fee the casinos were required to pay to the state.

After poor results, Boyd closed this location in July 1998, selling many of its assets to Harrah's Entertainment for $12.5 million. The boat is no longer docked at the property, which is now owned and maintained by Cerner Corporation as their Riverport campus. In 2021, Cerner Corporation listed the property through Colliers International without a listed asking price.

References

External links
 1999 photos at kchistory.org: 1 2 3 4 5

Casinos in Missouri
Defunct riverboat casinos
Former buildings and structures in Kansas City, Missouri
Defunct casinos in the United States
Boyd Gaming